The 2004 Super 12 season was the ninth season of the Super 12, contested by teams from Australia, New Zealand and South Africa. The season ran from February to May 2004, with each team playing all the others once. At the end of the regular season, the top four teams entered the playoff semi finals, with the first placed team playing the fourth and the second placed team playing the third. The winner of each semi final qualified for the final, which was contested by the Brumbies and the Crusaders at Canberra Stadium. The Brumbies won 47 – 38 to win their second Super 12 title.

Table

Results

Round 1

Round 2

Round 3

Round 4

Round 5

Round 6

Round 7

Round 8

Round 9

Round 10

Round 11

Round 12

Finals

Semi finals

Grand final

References

1
Super Rugby seasons
1
1
S